Lowdermilk is a surname. Notable people with the surname include:

Bree Lowdermilk, American musical theater composer
Dwayne Lowdermilk (born 1958), Canadian ice hockey player
Grover Lowdermilk (1885–1968), American baseball player
Johnny Lowdermilk (born 1992), American football player
Kirk Lowdermilk (born 1963), American football player
Lou Lowdermilk (1887–1975), American baseball player
Susan Lowdermilk (born 1963), American artist and educator
Walter C. Lowdermilk (1888–1974), American soil conservationist
William Harrison Lowdermilk (1839–1897), American soldier

Dale Lowdermilk (born 1948), writer, political satire, Founder National Organization Taunting Safety and Fairness Everywhere, NOTSAFE(.)ORG

See also
Loudermilk (disambiguation)